Lewysohn is a surname. Notable people with the surname include:

Abraham Lewysohn (1805-1860) Hebraist and rabbi
Ludwig Lewysohn (1819-1901), German rabbi

Jewish surnames
Levite surnames
Yiddish-language surnames
Patronymic surnames